Bridie O’Gorman (born 8 December 1998) is an Australian rugby union player. She plays Prop for the NSW Waratahs in the Super W competition.

Biography 
O'Gorman made her international debut for Australia against Fiji on 6 May 2022 at the Suncorp Stadium in Brisbane. She also featured against Japan in her second appearance for the Wallaroos a few days later. She was named in the squad for the 2022 Pacific Four Series. She started against the Black Ferns in the opening match of the Pacific Four series on 6 June.

O'Gorman was named in the Wallaroos squad for a two-test series against the Black Ferns at the Laurie O'Reilly Cup. She was selected in the team again for the delayed 2022 Rugby World Cup in New Zealand.

References

External links
Wallaroos Profile

1998 births
Living people
Australia women's international rugby union players
Australian female rugby union players
21st-century Australian women